Guile of Women is a 1921 American silent comedy film directed by Clarence G. Badger and written by Edfrid A. Bingham. The film stars Will Rogers, Mary Warren, Bert Sprotte, Lionel Belmore, Charles Smiley, and Nick Cogley. The film was released on January 1, 1921, by Goldwyn Pictures.

Cast       
Will Rogers as Hjalmar Maartens
Mary Warren as Hulda
Bert Sprotte as Skole
Lionel Belmore as Armstrong
Charles Smiley as Captain Larsen 
Nick Cogley as Captain Stahl
Doris Pawn as Annie
John Lince as Butler
Jane Starr as Maid

References

External links

 

1921 films
1920s English-language films
Silent American comedy films
1921 comedy films
Goldwyn Pictures films
Films directed by Clarence G. Badger
American silent feature films
American black-and-white films
1920s American films